Rangitane or Rangitāne is a settlement on the east bank of the Rangitane River and the northern shore of the Kerikeri Inlet in the Far North District of New Zealand. It is 13 km north-west of Kerikeri by road.

In early 2021 an upgrade to the boat ramp and marine facilities at Rangitane was announced. The upgrade plan was approved for fast-track consenting in September but was put on hold in January 2022.

Demographics
Statistics New Zealand describes Rangitāne as a rural settlement. Rangitāne is part of the larger Rangitane-Purerua statistical area.

Rangitāne had a population of 390 at the 2018 New Zealand census, an increase of 111 people (39.8%) since the 2013 census, and an increase of 126 people (47.7%) since the 2006 census. There were 135 households, comprising 195 males and 198 females, giving a sex ratio of 0.98 males per female, with 66 people (16.9%) aged under 15 years, 51 (13.1%) aged 15 to 29, 198 (50.8%) aged 30 to 64, and 78 (20.0%) aged 65 or older.

Ethnicities were 81.5% European/Pākehā, 34.6% Māori, 1.5% Pacific peoples, 2.3% Asian, and 1.5% other ethnicities. People may identify with more than one ethnicity.

Although some people chose not to answer the census's question about religious affiliation, 53.8% had no religion, 36.9% were Christian and 2.3% had other religions.

Of those at least 15 years old, 81 (25.0%) people had a bachelor's or higher degree, and 51 (15.7%) people had no formal qualifications. 72 people (22.2%) earned over $70,000 compared to 17.2% nationally. The employment status of those at least 15 was that 153 (47.2%) people were employed full-time, 51 (15.7%) were part-time, and 12 (3.7%) were unemployed.

References

Far North District
Populated places in the Northland Region